Access to the Internet in Colombia shows a marked increase during the last few years. As of September 2009, the web connections surpassed two million, as compared with an estimated total of 900,000 Internet subscribers by the end of 2005. The current figure equated to 17 million Internet users, plus 3.8 million mobile internet users, or 38.5 percent of the 2009 population, as compared with 4,739,000 Internet users in 2005, or 11.5 percent of the 2005 population (10.9 per 100 inhabitants). Colombia had 581,877 Internet hosts in 2006. This represents an overall growth of 54 percent each year, the highest in Latin America. Although as many as 70 percent of Colombians accessed the Internet over their ordinary telephone lines, dial-up access is losing ground to broadband. In 2005 Colombia had 345,000 broadband subscriber lines, or one per 100 inhabitants. In 2006 the number of personal computers per 1,000 people increased to an estimated 87 per 1,000 inhabitants, a rate still below that in other large Latin American economies. As of 2009, Colombia duplicated the number of personal computers reaching 26.3 percent, as compared with the rest of Latin America which showed a decreasing trend (being Argentina and Mexico the only other country with positive growth, showing a 2.3 increase).

The internet country code is .co.

History
The first approximation to internet made by Colombia was in 1988 with the creation of RDUA, a local network, by University of the Andes, Colombia, then in 1994 the same university is entrusted by a group of other Colombian universities and some government agencies to become the first Internet Service Provider in the country, on June 4, 1994, the first signal coming from Homestead, FL was received, this signal was sent through "IMPSAT" satellite service to a hill in Bogotá (Cerro de Suba), then redirected to Bogotá's tallest building (Torre Colpatria) and finally to the university campus .

Broadband Internet access
Broadband Internet access has been available in Colombia since 1997. The service was originally charged in American dollars, remaining expensive. The pioneers in broadband access in Colombia were University of the Andes and Cable operator TV Cable S.A both based in Bogotá, Colombia.

From 1997 to 2001, only the cities of Bogotá and Bucaramanga had broadband Cable Internet access, although during that time, the service remained expensive and was only available in the richest neighbourhoods.

In the year 2001, ADSL Internet access appeared in Colombia. The appearance of ADSL Internet access meant a commercial war between the Telecom companies and the cable operators (mainly in Bogotá and Bucaramanga). For some strange reason, Bogotá, the largest city by size in Colombia, and Bucaramanga, the sixth city by size, have been the only cities where Cable and ADSL operators are available throughout the whole city at the same time. Nowadays the fiercest battles to attract broadband users are in Bogotá and Bucaramanga.

Medellín, Cali, Barranquilla, and Cartagena the second, third, fourth and fifth cities by population in Colombia have only one ADSL operator that reaches the city as a whole. This means the ADSL operator and the cable operators are not competing directly in those cities so that tariffs are higher than in Bogotá or Bucaramanga.

With respect to all the cities below one million inhabitants, ADSL broadband access is available through Colombia-Telecom (50% owned by Colombian Government and 50% owned by Telefónica from Spain). Because in these cities and towns the only broadband provider is Colombia-Telecom the service remains expensive.
Note: As of late (2007) Telefónica Colombia has expanded DSL operations to all Capital and Major cities and all cities with a main office and a main satellite.

In Colombia there are three national ADSL and WiMax Broadband Providers. They hold monopoly positions in every city, with the notable exception of Bogotá.

With respect to Broadband Cable Providers, each one of them is available only in their native city, and constitutes a monopoly in its respective city.

National ISPs
 Telecom/Telefónica
Monopoly ADSL provider in all the cities and towns between 100,000 and 1,000,000 inhabitants.
It also has a minor share of ADSL Access in Bogotá, Medellín, Cali, Barranquilla
It has monopolistic ADSL and WIMAX Access in Bucaramanga.
 Empresa de Telecomunicaciones de Bogotá  "ETB" (90% owned by the city of Bogotá, and 10% owned by private investors).
Near monopolistic ADSL provider in Bogotá
Near Monopolistic WIMAX provider Armenia, Medellín, Barranquilla, Palmira, Cartagena, Villavicencio, Neiva, Pereira, Ibague, Manizales, Montería, Bucaramanga, Tunja, Santa Marta, Valledupar, Popayán, Cúcuta, Cartago.
Small WIMAX share in Cali
 Empresas Públicas de Medellín "EPM" (100% owned by the city of Medellín)
Near monopolic ADSL and WIMAX provider in Medellín
Small ADSL Share in Bogotá
Near monopoly WIMAX share in Cali
 Coldecon
Small ADSL Share in Colombia
Near monopoly wifi share in Cali
Near monopoly wifi share in Barranquilla
 Telmex Colombia S.A.
In July switched to Claro with an association with Comcel Colombia S.A
Near monopoly ASDL and WIMAX share of 1MB, 5MB, 10MB, 20MB in almost all cities of Colombia
Monopoly fiber share of 50MB on Bogotá, Chía, Cajicá, Sopó, Soacha, Cali, Tuluá, Buga, Palmira, Medellín, Itagüí, Bello, Envigado, Barranquilla, Soledad, Cartagena, Cúcuta and Pereira.

Regional ISPs
 TV Cable SA
 It has a mayor share on the cable broadband access in Bogotá. This company focuses on the richest neighbourhoods of Bogotá, and has found its market niche in the wealthy parts of Bogotá, mainly the northern part. Although it is a local player, it is the most technologically advanced broadband provider in Colombia.
 It was bought by Telmex Colombia S.A. when it entered business in Colombia.
 CableCentro
 It has a minor share of CABLE broadband access in most of the cities above 100 000 in Colombia.
 It was bought by Telmex Colombia S.A. when it entered business in Colombia.
 Cable Union de Occidente
 It has nearly monopolistic share of CABLE Broadband Access in Cali
 TV Cable Promision SA (completely unrelated with TV Cable SA)
 It has nearly monopolistic share of CABLE Broadband Access in Bucaramanga
 Dinanet
 It has monopolistic share of CABLE Broadband Access in Barranquilla
 Telecom Occidente
 Colombia's largest fixed wireless dual-play provider. Regionally focused on Cundinamarca.

Censorship
There are no government restrictions on access to the Internet or credible reports that the government monitors e-mail or Internet chat rooms. Individuals and groups engage in the expression of views via the Internet, including by e-mail. However, journalists in Colombia have long been targets of a range of attempts to obstruct or limit speech, from government threats to withhold publication licenses to outright intimidation and physical violence. Journalists in Colombia are threatened, physically attacked, or murdered. For journalists working in Latin America, death threats are commonplace. Because of threats from local drug cartels or other gangs and individuals, many journalists practice self-censorship, including many in Colombia who avoid reporting on corruption, drug trafficking, or violence by armed groups because of such threats.

Colombia was classified as engaged in selective Internet filtering in the social area with little or no evidence of filtering in the political, conflict/security, or Internet tools areas by the OpenNet Initiative in 2011.

Colombian law requires ISPs to monitor their content and report any illegal activity to the government.  Colombia's “Internet Sano” (healthy Internet) campaign calls for public education on “decent” ways of using the Internet as well as penalties for improper use. Some websites are blocked as part of the Internet Sano program, including various large adult entertainment websites which don't contain any illegal child pornography. Child pornography is illegal in Colombia.

ONI testing on two Colombian ISPs revealed evidence of one blocked website; the government has also taken measures aimed at reducing children's exposure to online pornography. The government has passed laws addressing online privacy, electronic surveillance, and cybercrime, although Colombia's national intelligence service has reportedly engaged in extrajudicial surveillance. A pending law governing digital copyright, which was proposed as a measure of compliance with Colombia's free trade agreement with the United States, is currently being contested at the Supreme Court by advocates who assert that the law violates the country's constitution by limiting citizens’ rights to access information.

In December 2009, an internaute was sent to prison for threatening president Álvaro Uribe's sons.

See also
 List of countries by number of Internet users
 List of countries by number of broadband Internet users

References

External links
 Colombia:Internet Usage and Market Reports
 Historia de la conexión de Uniandes a Internet  (English translation)
 Mi.com.co - Registro de Dominios Colombia
 

 
Communications in Colombia